The 2017 Texas Tech Red Raiders football team represented Texas Tech University in the 2017 NCAA Division I FBS football season. Kliff Kingsbury led the Red Raiders in his fifth season as the program's 15th head coach. The Red Raiders played their home games on the university's campus in Lubbock, Texas at Jones AT&T Stadium, and competed as members of the Big 12 Conference. They finished the season 6–7, 3–6 in Big 12 play to finish in eighth place. They were invited to the Birmingham Bowl where they lost to South Florida.

Previous season
The 2016 Texas Tech Red Raiders football team finished 5–7, 3–6 in Big 12 play. The team's conference wins were against Kansas, TCU, and Baylor and finished in 8th place in the Big 12. The Red Raiders finished the 2016 season with a 55–34 victory over Baylor, snapping a 5-game losing streak against the Bears.

The 2016 team finished with the 6th best offense and the worst defense in Division I FBS.

Personnel

Spring game

Texas Tech's 2017 spring game was held at The Ford Center at The Star in Frisco, Texas on April 1, 2017. The Red Raiders are the first collegiate football program to hold an event at The Star.

Schedule
Texas Tech announced their 2017 schedule on December 13, 2016. The 2017 schedule consisted of 6 home games, 5 away games, and 1 neutral site game in the regular season. The Red Raiders hosted Big 12 foes Oklahoma State, Iowa State, Kansas State, and TCU and traveled to Kansas, West Virginia, and Texas. Texas Tech played Baylor in Arlington, Texas at AT&T Stadium for the 76th meeting in their rivalry.

The Red Raiders hosted non-conference games against Eastern Washington and Arizona State and traveled to their other non-conference opponent Houston in Houston, Texas.

Season summary

Eastern Washington

The Red Raiders entered the game with quarterback Nic Shimonek making his first career start for Texas Tech after former Tech quarterback Patrick Mahomes II was drafted by the Kansas City Chiefs in the 2017 NFL Draft. Shimonek started the game by completing 14 straight passes and exited the game in the 3rd quarter, finishing 26/30 for 384 yards and 3 touchdowns with no interceptions. Red Raider backups McLane Carter and Jett Duffey went 3/3 for 49 yards, 1 touchdown and 2/2 for 16 yards, respectively.

The Red Raiders received the opening kickoff and started at their own 25-yard line, but a delay of game penalty pushed them back to the 20. Shimonek was sacked on 3rd and 7, forcing the Red Raiders to punt on a three and out. The Eagles started at the Texas Tech 39-yard line following the punt, but Nic Sblendorio fumbled the ball and it was recovered by Texas Tech's Douglas Coleman III. The Red Raiders failed to capitalize on the turnover and punted from the Eastern Washington 43-yard line. The two teams traded punts before Tech scored on a Justin Stockton 25-yard run late in the 1st quarter with Michael Ewton making the PAT.

Eastern Washington opened the second quarter by marching down field to the Texas Tech 4-yard line, getting their first score of the day on a 22-yard field goal from Roldan Alcobendas to trail 7–3 with 10:32 left in the first half. The Red Raiders responded to the field goal on their next possession with Shimonek finding Derrick Willies for a 75–yard touchdown reception to lead 14–3 after Ewton's PAT. The Eagle's made it to the Tech 31-yard line and decided to go for it on 4th and 1, but couldn't pick up the first down. After the turnover on downs, Shimonek threw a 68-yard touchdown pass to Keke Coutee to widen their lead to 21–3 following the PAT. The Eagles responded to the touchdown on their next possession with a 22-yard pass from Gage Gubrud to Terrance Grady; with Alcobendas making the PAT Eastern Washington trailed Texas Tech 10–21 with 4:07 left in the half. The Red Raiders would score another touchdown to lead 28–10 at halftime.

Texas Tech scored two offensive touchdowns in the 3rd quarter, one a 1-yard run from Tre King and another one a 4-yard run from Justin Stockton. With 3:09 left in the 3rd quarter, Guburd threw an interception to Willie Sykes who returned it 33-yards for a pick six, extending Tech's lead to 49–10 following Ewton's PAT. Texas Tech backup quarterback McLane Carter entered the game late in the 3rd quarter, ending the drive with a 22-yard touchdown pass Quan Shorts late in the 4th quarter. The Red Raiders ended their next two drives by turning over on downs. The Red Raiders won their season opener 56–10, improving to 5–0 in season openers under head coach Kliff Kingsbury. The Texas Tech defense held Eastern Washington, a team that has won 3 out of its last 5 games against FBS opponents, to only 10 points and 301 total yards while forcing 3 turnovers.

Arizona State

Kickoff was delayed for an hour due to thunderstorms in the Lubbock area.

The Sun Devils received the opening kickoff, with Michael Barden's kick going out of bounds. Arizona State started at their own 35-yard line, making it all the way to the Texas Tech 23-yard line before the drive stalled out. Brandon Ruiz tried for a 41-yard field goal, but missed. The Red Raiders took over at their own 23, but couldn't pick up a first down and punted the ball. Arizona State made it to the Texas Tech 26-yard line, before bringing out Ruiz for another field goal attempt. This time Ruiz's kick, a 44-yard attempt, was good, giving the Sun Devils a 3–0 lead midway through the 1st quarter. Despite a slow offensive start, Texas Tech scored 21 unanswered points to lead 21–3 at the end of the 1st.

On Arizona State's next offensive position they scored their first touchdown on a 3-yard pass from Manny Wilkins to Kyle Williams. On the drive, Texas Tech's defense committed 4 penalties. The Red Raiders almost scored on their next possession, but Desmond Nisby fumbled the ball just short of the goal line. The Sun Devils scored following the fumble recovery to trail 17–21 with 5:34 left in the half. Following miscues by both the defense and offense on previous drives, the Red Raiders scored on a 10-yard pass from Nic Schimonek to fullback Mason Reed. Texas Tech's defense stopped Arizona State's offense on the following drive, forcing the Sun Devils to punt from their own 38-yard line. On the punt, Michael Sleep-Dalton's punt was blocked by Ja'Deion High, who recovered the ball at the Arizona State 27-yard line. The Red Raiders scored quickly following the blocked punt, extending their lead to 35–17. The first half ended with Wilkins being sacked by Mychealon Thomas for a loss of 11-yards.

Texas Tech's offense struggled in the 3rd quarter, while the defense gave up 3 touchdowns to the Sun Devils. After trailing by 18 at halftime, Arizona State tied the game 45–45 after a 21-yard pass from Wilkins to N'Keal Harry with 9:52 left to play. The two teams traded punts before the Red Raiders retook the lead following receiver Dylan Cantrell's 3-yard touchdown run. On the next possession, Arizona State made it to their own 37-yard line but a false start penalty and Wilkins being sacked by Zach Barnes and Eli Howard pushed the Sun Devils back to their 17-yard line, bringing up 4th and 30. Wilkins tried a deep pass to Harry, but it was incomplete and Arizona State turned the ball over on downs, giving the Red Raiders a 52–45 victory.

Houston

Texas Tech closed non–conference play against instate and former Southwest Conference rival Houston.

Houston received the opening kickoff with their first drive ending in a Kyle Allen pass being intercepted by Dakota Allen. Texas Tech scored 3 off of the turnover with Michael Ewton making a 32-yard field goal to give the Red Raiders a 3–0 lead. The Cougars committed a total of 5 turnovers in the game while the Red Raiders only had 1. In a defensive battle, Texas Tech beat Houston 27–24, improving to 3–0 for the first time since 2013. With the victory, the Red Raiders ended the Cougars' 16-game home winning streak.

Oklahoma State

Texas Tech received the opening kickoff, but the drive ended in a Dominic Panazzolo punt from the Red Raiders' 33-yard line. Oklahoma State started at their own 37-yard line before scoring on a 14-yard pass from Mason Rudolph to James Washington to take a 7–0 lead. The Red Raiders punted once again on their next possession with the Cowboys starting at their own 30-yard line. Oklahoma State made it all the way to the Texas Tech 19-yard line before a Rudolph pass was intercepted by DaMarcus Fields and returned 95-yard for a touchdown to tie the game 7–7. Receiving the ball back, the Cowboys made it all the way to the Red Raiders' 5-yard line before the drive stalled out. Matt Ammendola tried for a 22-yard field goal, but the kick failed after hitting the right upright. Following the missed field goal, Texas Tech scored their first offensive touchdown of the game on a 3-yard pass from Nic Schimonek to Dylan Cantrell. The Cowboys scored a touchdown on their next two possessions to lead 21–14 with 3:49 left in the half. To end the first half, Michael Barden made a 24-yard field goal as time expired.

Kansas

The Red Raiders scored 2 touchdowns in the 1st quarter after the Jayhawks failed to convert on 4th down. During the 3rd quarter, Texas Tech kicker Michael Barden missed his first field goal of the season on a 44-yard attempt.

West Virginia

The Red Raiders entered the game ranked at #24 in the AP Poll, their first ranking since week 11 of the 2013 season. Texas Tech kicker Michael Barden missed 3 field goals during the game: from 43, 23, and 37 yards.

Iowa State

The kicking problems continued for Texas Tech with the Red Raiders using 3 different kickers throughout the game. Michael Ewton missed an extra point; Matthew Cluck missed a 35-yard field goal; and Michael Barden made an extra point.

Oklahoma

Kansas State

Baylor

Texas Tech received the opening kickoff, with receiver Keke Coutee returning it 92 yards for a touchdown. Baylor responded on the next drive with Charlie Brewer finding Gavin Holmes for a 4-yard touchdown pass. On the ensuing kickoff, Quentin Yontz returned Jay Sedwick's kick for 22 yards to the Texas Tech 47-yard line. The Red Raiders ended the drive on a 1-yard touchdown run from Tre King. The two teams traded punts on their next drives. After the Texas Tech punt, Baylor started at their own 35-yard line. The Bears made it to the Texas Tech 9-yard line when Brewer fumbled the ball with Dakota Allen recovering it for the Red Raiders. Texas Tech scored a touchdown following the Baylor fumble on a 5-yard pass from Nic Shimonek to T. J. Vasher. Baylor turned the ball over on downs on their next possession at the Texas Tech 1-yard line. The Red Raiders only made it to their own 31-yard line before having to punt. The Bears made it back to the redzone, but Brewer's pass was intercepted in the endzone by Vaughnte Dorsey. Texas Tech took a knee to end the first half with a 21–7 lead.

Baylor received the second half kickoff before going three-and-out and punted from their own 29-yard line. Texas Tech made it to the Baylor 1-yard line before Tre King fumbled with the ball being recovered by Jordan Williams for Baylor. The Bears turned the ball over on the next drive when Brewer was sacked at the Baylor 35-yard line and fumbled the ball; Mychealon Thomas recovered the ball at the Baylor 21-yard line. The Red Raiders scored 3 points off of the turnover with a 39-yard field goal from Clayton Hatfield. Baylor scored a touchdown on their next drive with a 6-yard pass from Brewer to Pooh Stricklin. On the following kickoff, the Bears attempted an onside kick that was recovered by Texas Tech at the Baylor 47-yard line. The Red Raiders started the drive at the Baylor 32-yard line after a catching interference penalty against Baylor. Texas Tech scored quickly with Shimonek throwing a 30-yard touchdown pass to Cameron Batson. Baylor started their next drive at their own 25-yard line. The Bears made it to the Texas Tech 40-yard line, but turned the ball over on downs after Brewer threw 4 incomplete passes in a row. Baylor attempted their first field goal attempt midway through the 4th quarter with Connor Martin making a 34-yard field goal. The Bears fumbled for a third time in the 4th quarter, with David Coleman III recovering it for the Red Raiders and returned it 31 yards for a touchdown. Following the fumble touchdown, Baylor answered back on their next drive with a 3-yard pass from Brewer to Denzel Mims. The Bears attempted another onside kick, with the Red Raiders recovering it at their own 49-yard line. Texas Tech ran the ball to end the game with a 38–24 victory.

The Red Raiders extended their win streak against the Bears to 2 games and snapped a four-game losing streak on the season. Texas Tech scored 17 points off of turnovers and forced four turnovers: one interception and three fumbles.

TCU

The Red Raiders' only score of the game came during the first quarter on a 22-yard field goal from Clayton Hatfield. The drive went on for 21 plays, the longest drive of the season in all of college football by snap count. Hatfield later missed a 20-yard field goal that went nowhere near the goal post, going far wide left.

The Saddle Trophy was re-introduced for the rivalry after being absent for 46 years.

Texas

McLane Carter started at quarterback for the Red Raiders. Carter went 11/16 for 175 yards in the 1st quarter, but only completed one pass in the 2nd quarter. Carter was pulled in the 4th quarter, finishing 16/37 for 237 yards with 2 interceptions and one rushing touchdown. Nic Shimonek came in at quarterback with his first pass going 52 yards to Keke Coutee. Shimonek's second pass was a 13-yard touchdown reception to T. J. Vasher. Shimonek finished 4/8 for 96 yards with 2 touchdowns. After trailing 10–20 at halftime, the Red Raiders staged a comeback for a 27–23 victory over the Longhorns.

South Florida (Birmingham Bowl)

Statistics

Scoring
Scores against all opponents

Scores against the Big 12

Offense

Special teams

Weekly awards
 Earl Campbell Tyler Rose Player of the Week
Nic Shimonek (week 3 vs. Arizona State)

 Big 12 Defensive Player of the Week
Dakota Allen (week 4 vs. Houston)

 Big 12 Special Teams Player of the Week
Ja'Deion High (week 3 vs. Arizona State)

 Big 12 Newcomer of the Week
DaMarcus Fields (week 5 vs. Oklahoma State)
Desmond Nisby (week 6 vs. Kansas)

Rankings

References

Texas Tech
Texas Tech Red Raiders football seasons
Texas Tech Red Raiders football